Rúben Sílvio Lino Gouveia (born 13 March 1985) is an Angolan professional footballer who plays for Portuguese club União Desportiva Alta de Lisboa as a midfielder.

Club career
Born in Lisbon, Gouveia never played at the professional level in his homeland, amassing third division totals of 186 matches and 30 goals over ten seasons whilst in representation of Estrela de Vendas Novas, Real SC,
Atlético SC, S.C.U. Torreense, U.D. Vilafranquense, Casa Pia AC, Clube Oriental de Lisboa (two spells) and União de Santarém. In January 2009, he went on loan to Halesowen Town of the English Isthmian League.

Gouveia signed with Girabola club C.R.D. Libolo in 2012. He continued to compete in the Angolan top flight the following years.

International career
After being awarded the country's citizenship, Gouveia made his debut for Angola on 28 May 2014 at the age of 29, in a 2–0 friendly win against Morocco.

References

External links

1985 births
Living people
People with acquired Angolan citizenship
Angolan people of Portuguese descent
Portuguese sportspeople of Angolan descent
Portuguese footballers
Angolan footballers
Footballers from Lisbon
Association football midfielders
Segunda Divisão players
C.D. Beja players
S.U. Sintrense players
G.D. Peniche players
Real S.C. players
Atlético S.C. players
S.C.U. Torreense players
U.D. Vilafranquense players
Casa Pia A.C. players
Clube Oriental de Lisboa players
Isthmian League players
Halesowen Town F.C. players
Girabola players
C.R.D. Libolo players
C.R. Caála players
S.L. Benfica (Luanda) players
Académica Petróleos do Lobito players
Angola international footballers
Portuguese expatriate footballers
Angolan expatriate footballers
Expatriate footballers in England
Angolan expatriate sportspeople in England